Mario Dotti IV  is an Italian former rugby union footballer who played in the 1930s, and 1940s. He played at representative level for Italy, and at club level for R.S. Ginnastica Torino, as a wing, i.e. number 11 or 14.

Playing career

International honours

Mario Dotti IV played Wing for Italy in the 3–0 victory over Romania at Campo Testaccio, Rome on Saturday 29 April 1939, the 0–3 defeat to Romania at Dinamo Stadion, Bucharest on Sunday 14 April 1940, and the 4–0 victory over Germany in Stuttgart on Sunday 5 May 1940.

Club career

Mario Dotti IV was a member of the R.S. Ginnastica Torino team that won the 1947 Campionati italiani. In honour of this, Dotti's name appears alongside his teammates on a plaque affixed to Motovelodromo Fausto Coppi in Turin, the squad was; Ausonio Alacevich, Guido Aleati, Sergio Aleati, Roberto Antonioli, Angelo Arrigoni, Vincenzo Bertolotto, Bianco, Giovanni Bonino, Campi, Gabriele Casalegno, Chiosso, Chiosso, Guido Cornarino, Mario Dotti IV, Aldo Guglielminotti, Pescarmona, Piovano, Rocca, Felice Rama (coach), Siliquini, Giovanni Tamagno, and Sandro Vigliano.

References

Benedetto Pasqua; Mirio Da Roit, Cent'anni di rugby a Torino (One Hundred Years of Rugby in Turin), Torino, Ananke [2011]
Francesco Volpe; Paolo Pacetti, Rugby 2012, Roma, Zesi [2011]
Gianluca Barca; Gian Franco Bellè, La Sesta Nazione (The Sixth Nation), Parma, Grafiche Step [2008]

Italian rugby union players
Italy international rugby union players
Possibly living people
Rugby union wings
Year of birth missing